Peter George Julius Pulzer (29 May 1929 – 26 January 2023) was an Austrian-born British historian who was Gladstone Professor of Government at the University of Oxford from 1985 till 1996.

Biography
Peter G. J. Pulzer was born in Vienna, Austria, in 1929 and his family migrated to the United Kingdom in 1939. He studied history at Cambridge University and gained a doctorate. Pulzer's 1966 book "The Emergence of Political Anti-Semitism in Germany and Austria 1867–1914" was published, the book was critically acclaimed in the academic work and well regarded concerning the research of anti-Semitism and is still regarded as the benchmark standard regarding such research.

Pulzer died on 27 January 2023, at the age of 93.

Honours
In 2008, Peter G. J. Pulzer received the Decoration of Honour for Services to the Republic of Austria.

Works 
 The rise of political anti-Semitism in Germany and Austria. J. Wiley, New York 1964. Übersetzung: Die Entstehung des politischen Antisemitismus in Deutschland und Österreich 1867–1914. Sigbert Mohn, Gütersloh 1966; durchgesehene und erweiterte Neuausgabe: Vandenhoeck & Ruprecht, Göttingen 2004, ISBN 3-525-36954-9 (with Forschungsbericht).
 Political representation and elections in Britain (= Studies in political science. Band 1). Allen & Unwin, London 1967.
 Germany 1870–1945. Politics, state formation, and war. Oxford University Press, Oxford 1997.
 (with Wolfgang Benz, Arnold Paucker) Jüdisches Leben in der Weimarer Republik / Jews in the Weimar Republic (= Schriftenreihe wissenschaftlicher Abhandlungen des Leo Baeck Instituts. Band 57). Mohr Siebeck, Tübingen 1998.
 (with Kurt Richard Luther) Austria 1945–95. Fifty years of the Second Republic. Ashgate, Aldershot 1998.
 Fog in Channel. Anglo-German perspectives in the nineteenth century. German Historical Institute, London 2000.
 Jews and the German state. The political history of a minority, 1848–1933. Blackwell, Oxford 1992.

References

1929 births
2023 deaths
Austrian emigrants to the United Kingdom
People from Vienna
20th-century British historians
Writers on antisemitism
Fellows of All Souls College, Oxford
Recipients of the Order of Merit of the Federal Republic of Germany